Fabili (also Romanized as Fābīlī; also known as Fablī) is a village in Lat Leyl Rural District, Otaqvar District, Langarud County, Gilan Province, Iran. At the 2006 census, its population was 59, in 16 families.

References 

Populated places in Langarud County